Tmesisternus modestus is a species of beetle in the family Cerambycidae. It was described by Charles Joseph Gahan in 1915. It is known from Papua New Guinea.

References

modestus
Beetles described in 1915